Tumbaden District is one of four districts of the province San Pablo in Peru.

References